Timpas is an unincorporated community located in Otero County, Colorado, United States.  The U.S. Post Office at La Junta (ZIP Code 81050) now serves Timpas postal addresses.

A post office called Timpas was established in 1891, and remained in operation until 1970. The community took its name from nearby Timpas Creek.

Geography
Timpas is located at  (37.818056,-103.773594).

See also

References

External links

Unincorporated communities in Otero County, Colorado
Unincorporated communities in Colorado